2010 China Open can refer to:
2010 China Open (snooker), a snooker tournament
2010 China Open (tennis), a tennis tournament
2010 China Open Super Series, an edition of the China Open badminton tournament